Beaverdam Formation may refer to the following geological formations in the United States:

 Beaverdam Formation (Delmarva) in Delaware and Maryland
 Beaverdam Formation (Idaho)